R.Mattheis Motorsport, currently competing as Blau Motorsport is a Brazilian auto racing team based in Petropolis, Rio de Janeiro. The team currently competes in Stock Car Brasil with Felipe Fraga and Allam Khodair using the Chevrolet Cruze. The team also competes in the Sertões rally, and the Mitsubishi Cup.

See also
 A.Mattheis Motorsport
 WA Mattheis

References

External links
  

Stock Car Brasil teams
2013 establishments in Brazil

Auto racing teams established in 2013
Brazilian auto racing teams